The Sex Lives of Cannibals: Adrift in the Equatorial Pacific is a 2004 travelogue by author J. Maarten Troost describing the two years he and his girlfriend spent living on the Tarawa atoll in the Pacific island nation of Kiribati.

Plot
In the book Troost described how he and his girlfriend Sylvia adjusted to life on the remote small island in the South Pacific, and built a life for themselves there. Troost described the unusual people they lived with, and bizarre and unfamiliar local customs, as well as the local people's reaction to Troost's own behaviour that they regarded as unusual.

In those two years, the author adjusted to an over-whelming fish-based diet, extreme heat, and an ineffective government, which the author describes as "Coconut Stalinism - though Stalin, at least, got something done." He described frequent electrical and water shortages, along with many other idiosyncrasies of living on such a small and remote island.

At the same time, Troost also challenges American complacency toward its own history, by doing so little to remember the many troops who died in the Battle of Tarawa during World War II, and the many foreign aid workers and consultants, who failed to consider the islanders' real needs or local culture.

Sequel
This book was followed up by Getting Stoned with Savages (2006), the further adventures of J. Maarten Troost and his wife, Sylvia.

Notes

References

2004 non-fiction books
Travel books
Kiribati literature
Books about Oceania